Swissôtel Krasnye Holmy Moscow is a 5-star hotel in Moscow managed by Swissôtel Hotels & Resorts.

History
The idea of the hotel project  began in 1995, when the OAO Moskva Krasnye Holmy was established to develop a business  complex called "Riverside Towers", located on the eastern tip of the unnamed island in Zamoskvorechye. The shareholder of this joint stock company is ENKA Holding.

The hotel construction was designed by Russian architects TTA, with the participation of international architect firm Woods Bagot. For the interior design, the work of interior design company BBG-BBGM was selected. 

After the opening in 2005, Swissôtel Krasnye Holmy Moscow was named “The Best Design Hotel” by Lodging Hospitality Magazine.

Location
Moscow's landmark hotel and one of the 40 tallest buildings in Moscow,

References

External links

Hotels in Moscow
Hotel buildings completed in 2005
Hotels established in 2005
Skyscrapers in Moscow
Skyscraper hotels in Russia